Back & Forth Vol7 is an album by industrial music group Skinny Puppy, consisting of outtakes from Last Rights and The Process. It was released through cEvin Key's Subconscious Communications in 2007.  It was the only Vault release issued during the Mythrus tour.

Track listing

Personnel 
 Written-by — Dwayne Goettel, Nivek Ogre and cEvin Key
 Guitar — Pat Sproule
 Artwork (Graphics) — Simon Paul
 Artwork (Painting) — Allen Jaeger

References

External links 
 

2007 compilation albums
Skinny Puppy compilation albums